Ostrya is a genus of eight to 10 small deciduous trees belonging to the birch family Betulaceae. Common names include hop-hornbeam and hophornbeam. It may also be called ironwood, a name shared with a number of other plants.

The genus is native in southern Europe, southwest and eastern Asia, and North and Central America. They have a conical or irregular crown and a scaly, rough bark. They have alternate and double-toothed birch-like leaves 3–10 cm long. The flowers are produced in spring, with male catkins 5–10 cm long and female aments 2–5 cm long. The fruit form in pendulous clusters 3–8 cm long with 6–20 seeds; each seed is a small nut 2–4 mm long, fully enclosed in a bladder-like involucre.

The wood is very hard and heavy. The genus name Ostrya is derived from the Greek word , which may be related to  "shell (of an animal)". Regarded as a weed tree by some foresters, this hard and stable wood was historically used to fashion plane soles.

Ostrya species are used as food plants by the larvae of some Lepidoptera species, including winter moth, walnut sphinx, and Coleophora ostryae.

Species
Ostrya has the following species:
 Ostrya carpinifolia Scop. – European hop-hornbeam - Mediterranean region of southern Europe, Middle-east, Turkey, Lebanon, Caucasus
 Ostrya chisosensis Correll – Chisos hophornbeam, Big Bend hophornbeam - endemic to Big Bend National Park in Texas
 Ostrya japonica Sarg. – Japanese hophornbeam - Japan, Korea, northern China
 Ostrya knowltonii Coville – Knowlton hophornbeam, western hophornbeam, wolf hophornbeam - Utah, Arizona, New Mexico, Texas
 Ostrya multinervis Rehd. – Central Chinese hop-hornbeam - central China
 Ostrya rehderiana Chun – Zhejiang hop-hornbeam - Zhejiang Province in China
Ostrya trichocarpa D.Fang & Y.S.Wang – Guangxi Province in China
 Ostrya virginiana (Mill.) K. Koch – eastern hophornbeam, American hophornbeam, ironwood - eastern US, eastern Canada, Mexico, Guatemala, El Salvador, Honduras
 Ostrya yunnanensis W.K.Hu – Yunnan hop-hornbeam - Yunnan Province in China
 †Ostrya oregoniana (fossil)
 †Ostrya scholzii (fossil)

Fossil record
†Ostrya scholzii fossil seeds of the Chattian stage, Oligocene, are known from the Oberleichtersbach Formation in the Rhön Mountains, central Germany.

References 

 Rushforth, K. (1985). "Ostrya". The Plantsman 7: 208-212.
 Flora of China: Ostrya
 Flora Europaea: Ostrya

External links 
 

 
Fagales genera